Of One Belief was the Gaelic Athletic Association lobby group founded to oppose the introduction of Irish Government grants to GAA players. The Group was established on December 7th, 2007 at a general meeting in the Elk Restaurant in Toome, County Antrim, Northern Ireland, which was attended by over 400 people.  A second meeting attended by over 300 people was held in County Cavan, Republic of Ireland in January 2008. The Group had a massive internet following and was excellent at communicating its messages after establishing a web-site www.ofonebelief.org which had over 4,800 registered subscribers.

Founding members
Chaired by Club Tyrone Founder Mark Conway “Of One Belief” was founded by Conway and Ryan Feeney former Derry GAA Official and Ulster Council Official.
The following individuals were part of the campaign committee, Seamus McCloy former Derry GAA County Chairman, Gerard Bradley former Tyrone GAA Treasurer and Ulster Council Member, Danny Scullion Derry GAA County Secretary, Barry O'Hagan former Armagh Inter County Player, Joe Brolly Former Derry Inter County Player and TV Pundit, Niall Laird Club Tyrone Committee Member from Omagh, John O'Neill from Donaghmore County Tyrone, Joe O'Brien Leading GAA Club official from County Longford, Seamus Mullan Chairman of Celtic Park Management Committee Derry City and former Inter-County Player, Pat Fahey (Leading Tyrone based Solicitor), Fergal P. McCusker GPA founding member and former Derry Inter-County Player, Liam Neils Ulster Council Member, Tyrone County Committee Member and Former Tyrone County Board Chairman and Donal McAnallen Secretary of the National Higher Education Committee.

Early supporters
Two Senior full-time officials with the Ulster Council of the GAA, Dr. Eugene Young and Ryan Feeney spoke strongly against the grants scheme at the meeting in Toome, however both highlighted that they were making their statements in a personal capacity as GAA members and that their views in no way reflected the policy of the Ulster Council. Jarlath Burns was briefly associated with Of One Belief but eventually backed the Grants scheme. Former GAA President Peter Quinn also publicly announced his opposition to the grant scheme and supported One Belief in their efforts to stop the proposals, the then Tyrone County Chairman Pat Darcy expressed strong support for the aims Of One Belief and in his address to the 2007 Tyrone Convention slated the GPA and their threat of strike, at the time leading Tyrone Inter County Player Sean Cananagh responded to Darcy's comments by stating “the Tyrone GAA County Committee doesn't speak for the GAA in Tyrone.”

The Group also had the support of Brian McGilligan (Former Derry Inter-County Player and Derry Senior Hurling Manager), Pat Spllane Kerry Great and Pundit and Terence “Sambo” McNaughton Antrim Senior Hurling Manager and Ulster Inter Provincial Manager

Mission
Of One Belief's mission was to use the democratic structures of the GAA to defeat the introduction of proposed player grants scheme, which they viewed as the introduction of pay for play. The group publicly stated that it did not want to work outside the GAA system or structure which would result in it becoming breakaway group, in the view of its members this is what the GPA was. The GPA who had advocated the scheme and had negotiated the grants project with the Irish Government without the GAA's supported threatened strike action of all county players if the GAA didn't agree to implement the grants scheme.

Grants scheme
After the approval of the grants scheme in principle by the Central Council of the GAA, both Conway and McAnallen resigned from all their various GAA responsibilities, with the exception of their club roles. Of One Belief had strong support in Ulster and eventually won the argument in the province when seven of Ulster's nine county boards were mandated by their clubs to vote against the scheme at the GAA congress, however other Counties supported the group with Mayo becoming the first County Committee in Ireland to reject the scheme on 8 December, the Counties that all voted against the scheme at the 2008 Congress were Antrim; Armagh; Derry; Donegal; Down; Fermanagh; Limerick; Longford; Louth; Mayo and Tyrone.

GPA Chief Executive Dessie Farrell was critical of group famously describing the meeting of grassroots volunteers at the Elk as “a rump of malcontents.” Farrell's Comments drew strong criticism from the then Ulster Council President Tom Daly, Ulster Secretary Danny Murphy, GAA President Nickey Brennan and Director General Paraic Duffy.

Appeal to Disputes Resolutions Authority
The group took several of the decisions of Central Council to the Disputes Resolutions Authority (DRA) who did not find in favour of any body and made both the GAA and "Of One Belief" split the cost of the dispute hearing. The verdict of the Authority stated that no final decision on the grants had been made due to Central Council agreeing to the deal "in principle" and until the GAA made decision on the issue there was no case to hear. The response of the DRA panel are summarised below: (Paragraph 1): “Their status as members has never been in question; the contribution of their witnesses alone to the Association over many years, both as players and administrators, is most impressive; and, quite properly, their standing to bring these arbitration proceedings has not been challenged. As such, suggestions that have been made publicly (although not by those involved in this arbitration) to the effect that the Claimants are in some way ‘external’ to the Association, are both incorrect and unfair”.

Paragraph 44: “It would seem sensible, both in the context of Rule 11 and any enhanced expenses scheme such as that under consideration here, to fix not only rates of expenses but types of expenses allowable, because while certain heads of expenditure might happily fall within any man's view of ‘expenses’ others might extend into what might justifiably be ‘reward’. “

Paragraph 54: “Central Council argue that if the enhanced meal or mileage rate exceeded what was properly treated as an expense, the Revenue Commissioners would be entitled to tax it and no sums were payable that fell into that bracket: accordingly there is a safeguard against breaches of Rule 11.”

Paragraph 54: “That does not, in our opinion, answer the question why a (well-off) club should remain prohibited from paying its members Civil Service mileage rates (since, by Central Council's definition, those rates constitute expenses and not reward), while inter-county players would be free to collect them”.

Paragraph 61: “The Schemes may be a very good idea, and they may be a very bad one”.

Paragraph 63: “Although unsuccessful in the result, it is clear from the two sets of arbitration proceedings that the Claimants cannot be said to have failed in their endeavours”.

Changes announced
In March 2008 Director General Pauric Duffy announced that the scheme would change from grants scheme to an eligible expenses scheme, this was a significant victory for Of One Belief as it dealt with the issue of County players receiving grants for playing Gaelic Games. The three GAA Presidential candidates also publicly expressed their concerns about the grants scheme in the lead up to the 2009 Congress.

At the 2008 GAA congress Conway, McAnallan and Seamus McCloy all put forward a strong argument against the grant scheme proposals however were their motions were defeated, the margin of defeat is unknown as no recorded vote was taken.

GPA recognition 
The group again lobbied strongly against the recognition of the GPA by the GAA at the 2010 Congress but failed in its attempts to halt the official recognition of the Players group who were granted an interim sum of €1.6 million following a strong media campaign and the continued threat of a players strike.

Role in the media
"Of One Belief" received mostly positive and sympathetic views from the majority of the Ulster-based media, however the Dublin-based press was strongly critical of the establishment of the group and its aims with Independent newspaper sports columnist Martin Breheny leading the charge by constantly deriding the leading members of the group, Breheny wrote a strong article critical of the Ulster Council in 2009 where he described "Of One Belief" as "a non-elected and grandiosely-titled group".

References

Gaelic games controversies
History of the Gaelic Athletic Association